The 1878 Newfoundland general election was held in 1878 to elect members of the 13th General Assembly of Newfoundland in Newfoundland Colony. The Conservative Party led by William Vallance Whiteway formed the government.

Results by party

Elected members
 Twillingate-Fogo
 S. B. Carter Conservative
 A. J. W. McNeily Conservative (speaker)
 R. P. Rice Conservative
 Bonavista Bay
 George Skelton Conservative
 Francis Winton Conservative
 James Saint Conservative
 Trinity Bay
 William V. Whiteway Conservative
 John Randall Conservative
 James H. Watson Conservative
 Bay de Verde
 A. Penney Conservative
 Carbonear
 John Rorke Conservative
 Harbour Grace
 Ambrose Shea Conservative
 Charles Dawe Conservative
 Brigus-Port de Grave
 Nathan Norman Conservative
 St. John's East
 Robert J. Kent Liberal
 Robert J. Parsons Liberal
 Michael J. O'Mara Liberal
 St. John's West
 Lewis Tessier Liberal
 Maurice Fenelon Liberal
 Patrick J. Scott Liberal
 Harbour Main
 Joseph I. Little Liberal
 Patrick Nowlan Liberal
 Ferryland
 Richard Raftus Liberal
 James G. Conroy Liberal
 Placentia and St. Mary's
 W. J. S. Donnelly Conservative
 James Collins Conservative
 Michael E. Dwyer Conservative
 Burin
 J. J. Rogerson Conservative
 James S. Winter Conservative
 Fortune Bay
 James O. Fraser Conservative
 Burgeo-LaPoile
 Alexander M. Mackay Conservative

References 
 

1878
1878 elections in North America
1878 elections in Canada
Pre-Confederation Newfoundland
1878 in Newfoundland